Freddie Mack (15 September 1934 – 11 January 2009), sometimes also spelled Freddy Mack and also known as Mr. Superbad, was a light-heavyweight boxer. He later enjoyed success in the UK as a Funk/Soul singer and DJ.

Biography
Mack was born on a cotton plantation in Bennettsville, South Carolina, to father Fred Mack, black American foreman of the Carolina Breeding Estate and mother Florence Purvis, an Italian kitchen worker originally from Bracciano, just outside Rome, Italy.

He was a childhood friend of Floyd Patterson, who introduced him to boxing at Cus D'Amato's gym on 14th Street, Manhattan,

As a light-heavyweight boxer, he reached 3rd place in the world ranking and is remembered for his knockouts against Sante Amonti, Jack Bodell, Chic Calderwood and Roman Morais, among others.

After 66 professional fights he became a sparring partner for, among others, Henry Cooper, Billy Walker (The Blonde Bomber) and John "Cowboy" McCormack.

After living some time in Rome, he retired to England, c. 1965, where he was introduced to the movie scene by fight fans Sir Richard Burton and Rex Harrison. Freddie enjoyed a short film career especially his part in Cleopatra where, as one of the black slaves, he carried Elizabeth Taylor into Rome.
He can also be found in small acting roles in the Invisible Man, The Great Rock n Roll Swindle with the Sex Pistols and Scotland's very own Taggart.

Then he embarked on yet another initially successful career as a singer/entertainer backed by an ever-changing band of British jazz and R&B musicians.

His first "group" was an R&B show with singers, dancers and two bands. This settled down into one backing band, called "The Mack Sound" put together by baritone sax player Roger Warwick. The band featured four to five horns, including, for a time, Otis Redding's trombone player Clarence Johnson, and full rhythm section with Alan Cartwright and B.J. Wilson.

From 1967 onwards his line-ups for the "Freddie Mack Sound", the "Fantastic Freddie Mack Show" or the "Freddie Mack Extravaganza" included, variously, Mel Day (vocals), Ray Lewis (bass), Dave Roffey (lead guitar), Ged Peck (lead guitar), Rod Jones (bass), Dick Morrissey (tenor sax), B.J. Wilson (drums), Roger Truth (drums). Alan Cartwright (bass), Johnny Orlando (vocals), Eddie 'Tan Tan' Thornton (trumpet), Bobby Morris (keyboards), Tex Makin (bass), Bill Davidson (organ), Art Regis(Organ), Viv Prince (Drums), Derry Wilkie (vocals), Tony Gomez (keyboards), Tony Morgan (vocals), Kookie Etan (vocals), Bob Mundy (vocals), Steve Mustang Sallis (lead guitar), Brian Williams (bass), Jimmy Jewell (tenor saxophone), Jeff Bridge (tenor saxophone), Phil Presland (baritone saxophone) John Walsh (organ), Pat Green (drums) and Chris Burdett (Tenor Saxophone) Steve Humphries, (Bass), Mick Clarke, (Guitar), Jeffrey Jai Seopardie, (drums), among many others.

In 1969 he was arrested for being an illegal alien in the UK but managed to avoid deportation.

At the end of 1974, Mack signed to K-Tel Records as Mr. Superbad and recorded many records under this label. He also sang on the 1975 hit "Kung Fu Man" on UltraFunk for Contempo Records.

He went to live in Plains, North Lanarkshire in 1979 and spent the time from then till his retirement in 2005 working as a Radio DJ and doing gigs with his Disco Show. His sexy American voice and his love of Soul Music could be heard over the airwaves of Radio Clyde every Saturday night for many years.

In 1981, his strong American voice featured on the Tight Fit megamix song Back to the Sixties. The track reached number 4 in the UK Charts. His words are at the start of the song and are "Wam Bam Alakazam, that's the sound, the super sound of the 60's, going back and checking it out, ready for some more? Hit that floor! The great days are back again!"
Following his departure from Radio Clyde, in 1991, he joined Glasgow's East End Radio and found huge popularity.

In 2001 he founded The Scot's Boxing Hall of Fame of which he was named President and there have been three Induction Events with a fourth on 13 September 2008 in the Quality Inn, Glasgow Central Hotel.

Between 2002 and 2003 he presented the Superbad Saturday Night programme on Lanarkshire radio station Clan FM which was a mix of soul music and chat. Mack died on 11 January 2009.

Discography
The Fantastic Freddy Mack Show (live 1966) – (Rayrik TPLMP 142/143)

As Freddie Mack's Extravanganza in Sounds (Extravaganza is misspelt on 7" release):
A: People – Part One; B: People – Part Two 1973

As Mr Superbad:
Superbad is Back 1973 (released only in America)
Superbad 1974
Souled Out 1975
Soul Motion 1976
Soul City 1977
Superbad Returns 1981

Professional boxing record

|-
|align="center" colspan=8|27 Wins (14 knockouts, 12 decisions, 1 DQ), 19 Losses (4 knockouts, 15 decisions), 3 Draws, 2 No Contests 
|-
| align="center" style="border-style: none none solid solid; background: #e3e3e3"|Result
| align="center" style="border-style: none none solid solid; background: #e3e3e3"|Record
| align="center" style="border-style: none none solid solid; background: #e3e3e3"|Opponent
| align="center" style="border-style: none none solid solid; background: #e3e3e3"|Type
| align="center" style="border-style: none none solid solid; background: #e3e3e3"|Round
| align="center" style="border-style: none none solid solid; background: #e3e3e3"|Date
| align="center" style="border-style: none none solid solid; background: #e3e3e3"|Location
| align="center" style="border-style: none none solid solid; background: #e3e3e3"|Notes
|-align=center
|Loss
|
|align=left| Jack Bodell
|PTS
|8
|7 September 1965
|align=left| Earls Court Arena, Kensington, London
|align=left|
|-
|Win
|
|align=left| Chic Calderwood
|KO
|8
|3 February 1965
|align=left| Wolverhampton, West Midlands
|align=left|
|-
|Win
|
|align=left| Jack Bodell
|TKO
|5
|29 September 1964
|align=left| Embassy Sportsdrome, Birmingham, West Midlands
|align=left|
|-
|Win
|
|align=left| Giuseppe Migliari
|KO
|8
|12 September 1964
|align=left| Rome
|align=left|
|-
|Loss
|
|align=left| Piero Del Papa
|PTS
|10
|24 May 1964
|align=left| Brescia, Lombardy
|align=left|
|-
|Win
|
|align=left| Benito Penna
|PTS
|10
|6 May 1964
|align=left| PalaLido, Milan
|align=left|
|-
|Win
|
|align=left| Ray Shiel
|TKO
|5
|25 March 1964
|align=left| Midlands Sporting Club, Solihull, West Midlands
|align=left|
|-
|Win
|
|align=left| Ron Gray
|DQ
|2
|3 March 1964
|align=left| Granby Halls, Leicester, Leicestershire
|align=left|
|-
|Loss
|
|align=left| Ray Shiel
|PTS
|8
|6 February 1964
|align=left| Tower Circus, Blackpool, Lancashire
|align=left|
|-
|Draw
|
|align=left| Piero Tomasoni
|PTS
|10
|15 November 1963
|align=left| Palazzetto dello Sport, Rome
|align=left|
|-
|Win
|
|align=left| Joey Armstrong
|TKO
|4
|23 October 1963
|align=left| Wolverhampton Civic Hall, Wolverhampton, West Midlands
|align=left|
|-
|Win
|
|align=left| Joe Louis
|KO
|1
|25 September 1963
|align=left| Midlands Sporting Club, Solihull, West Midlands
|align=left|
|-
|Loss
|
|align=left| Joe Erskine
|PTS
|10
|10 August 1963
|align=left| Newtown Pavilion, Newtown, Powys
|align=left|
|-
|Loss
|
|align=left| Sonny Banks
|SD
|10
|5 June 1963
|align=left| Graystone Ballroom, Detroit, Michigan
|align=left|
|-
|No Contest
|
|align=left| Renato Moraes
|NC
|7
|18 January 1963
|align=left| Palazzetto dello Sport, Rome
|align=left|
|-
|Draw
|
|align=left| Piero Tomasoni
|PTS
|10
|20 September 1962
|align=left| Brescia, Lombardy
|align=left|
|-
|No Contest
|
|align=left| Georges Torrecillas
|ND
|4
|19 August 1962
|align=left| Casino Municipale, San Remo, Liguria
|align=left|
|-
|Win
|
|align=left| Renato Moraes
|KO
|7
|13 April 1962
|align=left| Palazzetto dello Sport, Rome
|align=left|
|-
|Win
|
|align=left| Ottavio Panunzi
|KO
|2
|19 January 1962
|align=left| Palazzetto dello Sport, Rome
|align=left|
|-
|Loss
|
|align=left| Jesse Bowdry
|PTS
|10
|24 November 1961
|align=left| Palazzetto dello Sport, Rome
|align=left|
|-
|Win
|
|align=left| Santo Amonti
|TKO
|3
|6 October 1961
|align=left| Palazzetto dello Sport, Rome
|align=left|
|-
|Draw
|
|align=left| Chuck Garrett
|PTS
|10
|21 August 1961
|align=left| Vogue Arena, Chicago, Illinois
|align=left|
|-
|Loss
|
|align=left| Mauro Mina
|PTS
|10
|29 July 1961
|align=left| Estadio Nacional, Lima
|align=left|
|-
|Loss
|
|align=left| Mauro Mina
|PTS
|10
|12 April 1961
|align=left| Estadio Nacional, Lima
|align=left|
|-
|Loss
|
|align=left| Giulio Rinaldi
|PTS
|10
|24 February 1961
|align=left| Rome
|align=left|
|-
|Win
|
|align=left| Lino Rendon
|UD
|10
|30 January 1961
|align=left| St. Nicholas Arena, New York City
|align=left|
|-
|Win
|
|align=left| Wilfredo Avellez
|TKO
|1
|7 January 1961
|align=left| Madison Square Garden, New York City
|align=left|
|-
|Win
|
|align=left| Young Beau Jack
|KO
|6
|8 July 1960
|align=left| Sydney, Nova Scotia
|align=left|
|-
|Win
|
|align=left| Junius Washington
|PTS
|6
|10 December 1958
|align=left| Montreal Forum, Montreal, Quebec
|align=left|
|-
|Win
|
|align=left| Eddie Bramlett
|PTS
|6
|1 December 1958
|align=left| St. Nicholas Arena, New York City
|align=left|
|-
|Loss
|
|align=left| Yvon Durelle
|PTS
|10
|28 August 1958
|align=left| Moncton, New Brunswick
|align=left|
|-
|Loss
|
|align=left| Al Anderson
|TKO
|4
|5 May 1958
|align=left| St. Nicholas Arena, New York City
|align=left|
|-
|Win
|
|align=left| Eddie Bramlett
|PTS
|6
|7 April 1958
|align=left| St. Nicholas Arena, New York City
|align=left|
|-
|Win
|
|align=left| Louis "Baby" Jones
|UD
|6
|15 March 1958
|align=left| Boxing From Eastern Parkway, Brooklyn, New York
|align=left|
|-
|Loss
|
|align=left| Curtis Bruce
|SD
|6
|10 February 1958
|align=left| St. Nicholas Arena, New York City
|align=left|
|-
|Win
|
|align=left| Floyd McCoy
|PTS
|6
|13 January 1958
|align=left| St. Nicholas Arena, New York City
|align=left|
|-
|Loss
|
|align=left| Jerry Luedee
|TKO
|8
|2 September 1957
|align=left| St. Nicholas Arena, New York City
|align=left|
|-
|Win
|
|align=left| Dennis McCann
|TKO
|5
|23 July 1957
|align=left| Ansonia, Connecticut
|align=left|
|-
|Win
|
|align=left| Floyd McCoy
|PTS
|6
|18 July 1957
|align=left| Sherbrooke, Quebec
|align=left|
|-
|Win
|
|align=left| Wilson Hannibal
|PTS
|6
|24 June 1957
|align=left| St. Nicholas Arena, New York City
|align=left|
|-
|Win
|
|align=left| Lou Perry
|PTS
|6
|13 May 1957
|align=left| St. Nicholas Arena, New York City
|align=left|
|-
|Loss
|
|align=left| Dennis McCann
|PTS
|6
|19 April 1957
|align=left| Hartford, Connecticut
|align=left|
|-
|Win
|
|align=left| Rudy Williams
|KO
|1
|8 November 1956
|align=left| Sunnyside Gardens, Queens, New York City
|align=left|
|-
|Win
|
|align=left| Charley Black
|PTS
|4
|29 September 1955
|align=left| Olympic Auditorium, Los Angeles, California
|align=left|
|-
|Loss
|
|align=left| Angelo DeFendis
|PTS
|6
|28 June 1955
|align=left| Freeport Stadium, Freeport, New York
|align=left|
|-
|Loss
|
|align=left| Al Anderson
|PTS
|6
|14 June 1955
|align=left| Freeport Stadium, Freeport, New York
|align=left|
|-
|Loss
|
|align=left| Paul Pender
|TKO
|4
|6 January 1955
|align=left| Mechanics Hall, Boston, Massachusetts
|align=left|
|-
|Loss
|
|align=left| David Bondulich
|TKO
|3
|8 November 1954
|align=left| St. Nicholas Arena, New York City
|align=left|
|-
|Win
|
|align=left| Tommy Selkirk
|PTS
|4
|23 August 1954
|align=left| Boxing From Eastern Parkway, Brooklyn, New York
|align=left|
|-
|Loss
|
|align=left| Lou Perry
|PTS
|4
|16 August 1954
|align=left| Boxing From Eastern Parkway, Brooklyn, New York
|align=left|
|-
|Loss
|
|align=left| Alan Watson
|KO
|2
|12 August 1954
|align=left| Eintracht Oval, Astoria, Queens, New York City
|align=left|

References

1934 births
2009 deaths
People from Bennettsville, South Carolina
Boxers from South Carolina
American radio DJs
Light-heavyweight boxers
American soul singers
Singers from South Carolina
British radio people
American male boxers
20th-century American singers
Acid Jazz Records artists